Rhinella rubescens is a species of toad in the family Bufonidae.
It is endemic to Brazil.
Its natural habitats are moist savanna, subtropical or tropical moist shrubland, subtropical or tropical high-altitude shrubland, rivers, freshwater marshes, pastureland, rural gardens, urban areas, and ponds.
It is threatened by habitat loss. Its color is a golden orange.

References

Sources

rubescens
Endemic fauna of Brazil
Taxonomy articles created by Polbot
Amphibians described in 1925